Władysław Świątecki may refer to:

 Władysław Świątecki (inventor), Polish inventor and airman
 Władysław Świątecki (physicist), Polish nuclear physicist